Alexis Elizalde Estévez (born September 19, 1967, in Havana) is a Cuban retired discus thrower. He represented his country twice at the Summer Olympics, in 1996 and 2000, and was a three-time participant at the World Championships in Athletics (1993, 1995 and 1997).

Elizalde's highest honour was a gold medal at the 1993 Summer Universiade. He was twice a silver medallist at the Pan American Games (1995 and 1999) and also won two Central American and Caribbean Games titles during his career. Among his other major medals was a silver at the 1994 IAAF World Cup and a bronze medal at the 1991 Summer Universiade.

International competitions

References

Central American and Caribbean Games – GBR Athletics
Pan American Games – GBR Athletics

1967 births
Living people
Athletes from Havana
Cuban male discus throwers
Olympic athletes of Cuba
Athletes (track and field) at the 1996 Summer Olympics
Athletes (track and field) at the 2000 Summer Olympics
Pan American Games medalists in athletics (track and field)
Athletes (track and field) at the 1991 Pan American Games
Athletes (track and field) at the 1995 Pan American Games
Athletes (track and field) at the 1999 Pan American Games
World Athletics Championships athletes for Cuba
Pan American Games silver medalists for Cuba
Universiade medalists in athletics (track and field)
Central American and Caribbean Games gold medalists for Cuba
Competitors at the 1993 Central American and Caribbean Games
Competitors at the 1998 Central American and Caribbean Games
Universiade gold medalists for Cuba
Universiade bronze medalists for Cuba
Central American and Caribbean Games medalists in athletics
Medalists at the 1991 Summer Universiade
Medalists at the 1993 Summer Universiade
Medalists at the 1995 Pan American Games
Medalists at the 1999 Pan American Games
20th-century Cuban people